The 1995 Singer Champions Trophy was held in Sharjah, UAE, between October 11-20, 1995. Three national teams took part: Pakistan, Sri Lanka and West Indies.

The 1995 Champions Trophy started with a double round-robin tournament where each team played the other twice. The two leading teams qualified for the final. Sri Lanka won the tournament and US$30,000.

Matches

Group stage

Final

See also
 Sharjah Cup

References

 
 Cricket Archive: Singer Champions Trophy 1995/96
 ESPNCricinfo: Singer Champions Trophy, 1995/96
 

International cricket competitions from 1994–95 to 1997
Singer Champions Trophy, 1995
1995 in Emirati sport
International cricket competitions in the United Arab Emirates